San Cristóbal de Rajan District is one of ten districts of the Ocros Province in Peru.

See also 
 Uchku
 Wanaku

References

Districts of the Ocros Province
Districts of the Ancash Region